Ovada is an administrative ward in the Chemba District of the Dodoma Region of Tanzania. According to the 2002 census, the ward had a total population of 9,544.

References

Wards of Dodoma Region